Lyautey is the name of:
Hubert Lyautey, military governor and then Resident-General of then-French Morocco from 1907 through 1925
Port Lyautey, Morocco, named after Hubert Lyautey; now renamed Kenitra
Place Lyautey, a prominent public square in Casablanca, Morocco
Marechal Lyautey (ocean liner, 1924)
Mount Lyautey, a mountain in Alberta, Canada